Belsize tunnel is a railway tunnel at Belsize Park on the Midland Main Line between Kentish Town and West Hampstead Thameslink.

It was built between 1865 and 1867 for the Midland Railway extension from Bedford to London St Pancras. The ceremony of laying the first brick was performed on 27 January 1865 by Mr. Price, the chairman of the company, at Barham Road, Haverstock Hill. The contract price for the tunnel was £250,000.

The last brick was laid on 20 June 1867 by the chairman when the directors of the railway travelled along the line between Bedford and London.

The construction of the line out of St Pancras consisted of four tracks for the first , with the exception of the Belsize Tunnel which only had two tracks.  This was remedied in 1884  by the completion of another tunnel running parallel, to allow the full route of 6 miles to expand to four running lines. It was built under the Midland Railway (Additional Powers) Act, 1881. The additional tunnel was designed by W.H. Barlow, with James Campbell as reference engineer.

References

1867 establishments in England
Tunnels completed in 1867
Railway tunnels in London
Railway tunnels in England
Midland Railway
Rail transport in London
Tunnels in London